Hilda Koronel (born Susan Reid; January 17, 1957) is a MMFF, FAMAS, Luna and Urian award-winning Filipino actress. Born to a Filipino mother and an American father who was a serviceman in Clark Air Base, she has starred in around 45 films, many of which are critically acclaimed, since 1970.

She started her showbiz career in the early 70s as a Lea Productions' contract star and was paired with Ed Finlan, Walter Navarro, Tirso Cruz, III and Jay Ilagan which eventually became her husband. Because of her natural gift of acting, Lino Brocka took notice of her and directed her in a weekly drama show, entitled, "Hilda". Her career got off to an unprecedented start becoming the youngest winner of the FAMAS Best Supporting Actress award in 1970 right at the beginning of her career which she won at the age of just 13 for her role in the 1970 film Santiago.

In 1975 and 1976, she starred in the Lino Brocka classics Maynila: Sa mga Kuko ng Liwanag, which won six FAMAS awards in 1976, and Insiang, which won both a FAMAS Award and a Gawad Urian Award in 1977. To date she has won three awards and received 11 nominations.

In 2013, she received a Luna Award for best supporting actress for her role in The Mistress.

As a professional actress she also did Television Work in Mini Series played leading or regular guest roles in Movies and TV Series in the Philippines. In Esperanza in 1998 and in 2002 Kung Mawawala Ka and 2005’s Ikaw Ang Lahat Sa Akin was her last full length drama series.

Personal life
She attended Manuel L Quezon University in Quiapo for her secondary education and finished International Studies at Maryknoll College, now Miriam College.

In May 2000, Koronel married Filipino-American businessman Ralph Moore, Jr. in Laughlin, Nevada.

Koronel has 6 children. Leona, Ixara, and Patricia (with actor Jay Ilagan); Isabel (with Bambi del Castillo); Gabrielle (with Spanky Monserrat); and Diego (with Dr. Victor Lopez).

Filmography

Film

Television

Awards

FAMAS (Filipino Academy of Movie Arts and Sciences Awards)

Film Academy of the Philippines (Luna Awards)

Gawad Urian (Manunuri ng Pelikulang Pilipino)
{| width="70%" class="wikitable sortable"
|-
!width="10%"| Year
!width="35%"| Nominated work
!width="40%"| Category
!width="15%"| Result
|-
|align="center"| 2006
|align="center"|  Santa Santita
|rowspan="3" align="center"| Best Supporting Actress'''
| 
|-
|align="center"| 2004
|align="center"| Crying Ladies 
| 
|-
|align="center"| 2001
|align="center"| Tanging Yaman| 
|-
|align="center"| 1978
|align="center"| Kung Mangrap Ka't Magising|rowspan = 2 align="center"| Best Actress| 
|-
|align="center"| 1977
|align="center"| Insiang| 
|}

Maria Clara Awards

Awards from the press

Film festivals

Critics Award

Notes
 ensemble nomination ( Nasaan Ka Man).
 Shared with the cast of Tanging Yaman''.

References

External links 

 

1957 births
Living people
ABS-CBN personalities
Actresses from Pampanga
Centro Escolar University alumni
Filipino child actresses
Filipino people of American descent
Filipino people of Kapampangan descent
Filipino film actresses
Filipino television presenters
Filipino television actresses
Filipino women comedians
Filipino women television presenters
GMA Network personalities
Kapampangan people
People from Angeles City
People from Metro Manila